The Scottish Young Professional Championship is a golf tournament for young golfers that has been played since 1958. From its founding until 2002 it was known as the Scottish Assistants' Championship. Initially played over 36 holes it has generally been played over 72 since 1970.

Winners

2022 Graeme Robertson
2021 Dominic Bradburn
2020 Scott Gillies
2019 Scott Grant
2018 Graeme McDougall
2017 Kris Nicol
2016 Paul O'Hara
2015 Paul O'Hara
2014 Gavin Hay
2013 Paul O'Hara
2012 Graeme Brown
2011 David Patrick
2010 David Patrick
2009 David Patrick
2008 Greg McBain
2007 Kenneth Glen
2006 Callum Nicoll
2005 Alan Lockhart
2004 Gerard Duncan
2003 Gary Dingwall
2002 Chris Kelly
2001 Chris Kelly
2000 Craig Lee
1999 Alastair Forsyth
1998 David Orr
1997 Martin Hastie
1996 Steven Thompson
1995 Alan Tait
1994 Scott Henderson
1993 John Wither
1992 Euan McIntosh
1991 Gordon Hume
1990 Paul Lawrie
1989 Colin Brooks
1988 Gary Collinson
1987 Calum Innes
1986 Philip Helsby
1985 Campbell Elliott
1984 Campbell Elliott
1983 Alastair Webster
1982 Robert Collinson
1981 Mark Brown
1980 Fraser Mann
1979 Niall Cameron
1978 Jim McCallum
1977 Steve Kelly
1976 Craig Maltman
1975 Craig Maltman
1974 Jim Noon
1973 Robin Fyfe
1972 Craig Maltman
1971 Jimmy Hamilton
1970 Bill Lockie
1969 Donald Ross
1968 Norman Wood
1967 Hugh McCorquodale
1966 Jack Steven
1965 David Huish
1964 Lew Taylor
1963 Bobby Walker
1962 Bobby Walker
1961 Bobby Walker
1960 Bobby Walker
1959 Billy McCondichie
1958 John Carter

Additional source:

References

Golf tournaments in Scotland
Recurring sporting events established in 1958
1958 establishments in Scotland